Red Cross Girls (Spanish: Las chicas de la Cruz Roja) is a 1958 Spanish film directed by Rafael J. Salvia. It is a musical romantic comedy.

Plot
Four women from different social backgrounds - Julia (Luz Márquez), Isabel (Mabel Karr), Paloma (Concha Velasco) and Marion (Katia Loritz) - meet in Madrid while soliciting donations for the Red Cross, attracting men and becoming good friends in the process.

Cast
 Antonio Casal as Andrés
 Luz Márquez as Julia
 Mabel Karr as Isabel
 Concha Velasco as Paloma
 Tony Leblanc as Pepe
 Katia Loritz as Marion
 Arturo Fernández as Ernesto
 Ricardo Zamora Jr. as León

Reception
The film critic Lorenzo Hortelano considered Red Cross Girls one of the best examples of the "well-meaning, humorous and nostalgic popular" Spanish cinema of the 1950s and 1960s, following a romantic narrative set against a background that "praises "the joy of the 'modern' Madrid of the fifties."

In the 1980s some Spanish critics dismissed this film's genre as “silly comedies” that presented a false view of Spanish life.

Soundtrack
The main theme, composed by Augusto Algueró became a popular hit in Spain.

References

Further reading

External links
 

1958 films
1958 romantic comedy films
Films with screenplays by Rafael J. Salvia
Spanish romantic comedy films
Films scored by Augusto Algueró